Robert Brown (2 December 1931 – June 2019) was a Scottish professional footballer who played as a full back.

Career
Born in Motherwell, Brown played for  Polkemmet Juniors, Motherwell and Workington. Brown was Workington's record appearance holder, and made a total of 469 league and cup appearances for the club between 1956 and 1967. He also spent some time as player-coach.

His appearance record was beaten by Kyle May in 2015. His son Bobby also played for Workington. He died in June 2019, aged 87.

References

1931 births
2019 deaths
Scottish footballers
Motherwell F.C. players
Workington A.F.C. players
Scottish Football League players
Scottish Junior Football Association players
English Football League players
Association football fullbacks
Footballers from Motherwell
Workington A.F.C. non-playing staff
Workington A.F.C. managers
Scottish football managers